The RPG-32 Barkas (Russian: РПГ-32) is a reusable Russian shoulder-launched, unguided anti-tank rocket system. It was designed and developed by state-owned Unitary enterprise (FGUP) "Bazalt" weapon manufacturing company. It is also assembled in Jordan from Russian-made kits from Bazalt under the name "Nashshab" (Arabic: ار بي جي نشاب).

Development
It was developed between 2005 and 2007 by Bazalt on request and under contract from Jordan. The first RPG-32 'Nashshab' grenade launchers were to be delivered to Jordan from Russia in 2008, and it was planned that the RPG-32 and its ammunition would be mass-produced in Jordan under license at the JADARA factory.

On 30 May 2013, Rostec chief executive officer (CEO) Sergey Chemezov and King Abdullah II opened a production facility for the Russian RPG-32 in Jordan.

Design
In February 2015, Jordanian company Jadara Equipment & Defence Systems revealed they had incorporated the RPG-32 into a quad-launcher remote weapon station (RWS). The "Nashshab" (Archer) system comes in two versions: the Quad-1 is tripod-mounted meant to defend fixed positions, with tubes arranged in a 2×2 configuration and controlled either remotely or through a wire up to 300 m away; the Quad-2 is vehicle mounted for use against infantry, vehicles, and pillboxes in urban terrain, with tubes arranged in a 4×1 configuration and operated from a control unit inside the vehicle. The stations have day/night sights with rangefinding and automatic targets acquisition capabilities.

Raptor
In November 2022, Jadara Equipment & Defence Systems announced they would begin production of the Raptor rocket launcher later that year. The Raptor is a development of the Nashshab RPG-32 using a 107 mm rocket. It uses the same GS-2R reusable sighting system with a laser rangefinder to calculate ballistic trajectories for better accuracy, giving it an effective range of 500 m. The warhead can penetrate 500 mm rolled homogeneous armor (RHA) after explosive reactive armour (ERA) and the complete system weighs . Unlike the Nashshab, which was a joint development with Russia, the Raptor will be made in Jordan entirely.

Combat history
In March 2016, video was released of Ansar al-Sharia (Yemen) using the RPG-32 against Houthi forces during the Yemeni Civil War. It is unknown how the terrorist group could have acquired such a modern and advanced weapon system, but it is likely they were initially supplied to Yemeni loyalist forces by the user nations of Jordan or the UAE, part of the Saudi Arabian-led intervention in Yemen, then captured by militants. The RPG-32 has also been seen in use by Kurdish Peshmerga forces in northern Iraq.

Users

 
 
 
  – Besides captured, most are from Jordan and manufactured through third-party suppliers.

References

Rocket-propelled grenade launchers of Russia
Bazalt products
Military equipment introduced in the 2010s